College North is a Metromover station in Downtown, Miami, Florida.

This station is located on Northeast Fifth Street and First Avenue, opening to service April 17, 1986.

Station layout

Places of interest
Central Baptist Church
First United Methodist Church
Miami Dade College (Wolfson Campus)
501 First Avenue Building
521 First Avenue Building
541 First Avenue Building
481 First Avenue Building
Opus Tower
500 First Avenue Building
550 First Avenue Plaza

External links
 
 MDT – Metromover Stations
 1st Avenue entrance from Google Maps Street View

Brickell Loop
Inner Loop
Omni Loop
Metromover stations
Railway stations in the United States opened in 1986
1986 establishments in Florida